The 2016 Junior Oceania Cup was a field hockey tournament held in Gold Coast, Australia. The tournament served as a qualifier for the 2016 Men's and Women's Junior Hockey World Cups.

Both the Australian men's and women's teams finished the tournament undefeated, qualifying directly to the Junior World Cups. As Oceania is allocated two qualification places in the tournaments, both New Zealand teams also qualified for the Junior World Cups.

Teams
As the tournament was a qualifier for the Hockey Junior World Cups, only players under the age of 21 were eligible to play. While the Oceania Hockey Federation comprises multiple teams, only two participated in both the men's and women's tournaments.

Men's tournament
 
 

Women's tournament

Men's tournament

Results

Women's tournament

Results

Statistics

Final standings

Men's tournament

Women's tournament

Goalscorers

Men's Scorers
3 Goals
  Max Hendry
2 Goals

  Frazer Gerrard
  Aidan Sarikaya

1 Goal

  Joshua Beltz
  Tim Brand
  Tom Craig
  Isaac Farmilo
  Andrew Scanlon

Women's Scorers
4 Goals
  Madi Ratcliffe
1 Goal

  Madeleine Murphy
  Shanea Tonkin
  Georgia Wilson
  Savannah Fitzpatrick
  Mikaela Patterson
  Alia Jaques
  Deanna Ritchie
  Amy Robinson
  Phoebe Steele

References

International field hockey competitions hosted by Australia
Junior Oceania Cup
Junior Oceania Cup
field hockey
Sports competitions on the Gold Coast, Queensland
Oceania Cup
Oceania Cup